SexIs Magazine is a quarterly print publication and daily webzine devoted to sex and sexual culture. It was founded in 2008 by Web Merchants, the parent company of sex toy e-tailer EdenFantasys.com. The first print issue debuted in November 2009 and was distributed nationwide as an insert in BUST magazine. The website publishes articles, columns, video presentations, and news items daily.

According to AVN, SexIs provides "clear, honest sexual advice and education in a friendly, sex-positive way."

Coverage
SexIs covers a range of adult topics such as sex education, reproductive health, gay, lesbian and transgender issues, BDSM and kink, non-traditional lifestyle choices such as polyamory, arts and culture, fashion, body image, media, technology, sex and aging, and relationship advice. It also features interviews with personalities such as adult author/director Tristan Taormino, alt porn star April Flores (a.k.a. Fatty D), and counterculture icon Paul Krassner.

Charitable outreach
SexIs is a sponsor of the AIDS Service Center NYC. It also holds annual charity events at New York City's Museum of Sex.

Notable contributors
Among the notable regular contributors to SexIs are:

Buck Angel: FTM transsexual and adult film maker.
Rachel Kramer Bussel: Author, columnist, and editor, specializing in erotica.
Nina Hartley: Pornographic actress, pornographic film director, sex educator, feminist, and author.
Midori: Human sexuality writer, speaker, and sex educator. 
The Bloggess (Jenny Lawson): Journalist, blogger, and author.
Jerry King: Cartoonist, past winner of the National Cartoonist Society Magazine Gag Cartoon Award.
Em & Lo (Emma Taylor and Lorelei Sharkey): Authors, bloggers, sexual advice columnists.

References

Sexual
Official website SexIs Magazine
AIDS Service Center NYC ASCNYC.org
The Bloggess' website TheBloggess

Cultural magazines published in the United States
Pornographic magazines published in the United States
Quarterly magazines published in the United States
Magazines established in 2008